The Oltișor is a left tributary of the river Balta Dascălului in Romania. It flows into the Balta Dascălului near Cioroiu. The upper reach of the river is also known as Criva.

References

Rivers of Romania
Rivers of Olt County